The Cal State Fullerton Titans softball team represents California State University, Fullerton in NCAA Division I college softball.  The Titans have claimed one national championship, in 1986, along with a runner-up finish in 1983, as part of six total appearances in the NCAA Women's College World Series.  Cal State Fullerton also appeared in two Women's College World Series when the event was sponsored by the Association for Intercollegiate Athletics for Women.  The team plays home games at Anderson Family Field, a one-thousand seat venue built on campus in 1985, and plays as part of the Big West Conference.  The Titans are led by head coach Kelly Ford.

References